Viviana Zocco is an Argentine businesswoman, born in Buenos Aires, Argentina. She is founder and CEO of Grupo VI-DA and VI-DATEC, companies dedicated to technological development applied to culture, education and entertainment, with offices in Argentina, Mexico and the United States. Some of the most well-known companies belonging to Group VI-DA are: TICMAS, BajaLibros, InterCultural Division, GrandesLibros, Leamos, the entertainment platform TKM, 2 among others. Zocco is considered one of the most successful women entrepreneurs in Latin America. In 2016 she became Chapter Leader in Argentina of the international women's organization UPWARD Women

Biography

Education 
Zocco has an accounting degree from the Pontificia Universidad Católica Argentina and an MBA from Universidad del CEMA. She also studied Business Administration at Darden Graduate School of Business Administration, in the University of Virginia.

Career 
While studying in college, Zocco started working for Bank of America in Argentina in 1984. In 1988, she went on to work as CFO for Dow Chemical where she stayed till 1992.

Standard & Poor's 
In 1992, Zocco co-founded, with Diana Mondino, Risk Analysis S.A., one of the first local rating agencies in Argentina that, owing to its success, was acquired in 1995 by Standard & Poor's, with Zocco taking on the role at S&P as Managing Director for Latin America Origination business, and Buenos Aires Office Head. The acquisition of Risk Analysis by Standard and Poor's was published and studied by Babson College and it can be found as a study case in Harvard Business Review.

Grupo VI-DA 
Zocco is also founder and CEO of Grupo VI-DA, a company that offers digital products for the entertainment, cultural and media world. It includes: TKM, BajaLibros, LEAMOS, BajaMusica, BIDI.la, Vesvi.com, IndieLibros.com, GrandesLibros.com and DualLanguage.com, among others.

In 2005, Zocco founded TKM, a magazine aimed towards the teenage audience. Given TKM's success it evolved into an online community and became the most influential Hispanic-speaking media for millennials in Latin America and the United States. TKM has presence in multiple platforms and is a trendsetter in its communication style, taking over the millennial audience first in Argentina and then in Brasil, Colombia, Mexico and the United States.

That same year she founded 10Musica, currently known as Bajamusica.com, a digital music store based in Latin America, which consists of more than one million songs for download to any device.

Zocco has focused her attention on developing different initiatives linking technology, entertainment, culture and education.

She founded BajaLibros, an online Spanish language eBooks platform; Vesvi.com a Video-on-demand platform which distributes digital content like movies, series, and documentaries, among others; BIDI.la, a Spanish Digital Library for educational institutions and companies that provides a huge catalogue of books to universities, companies and different organizations within its online library platform; LEAMOS, a subscription system that from a monthly subscription that allows the downloading of books belonging to the catalogs of a number of large and independent publishers, allowing access to an almost infinite library.

Zocco also launched IndieLibros.com a self-publishing platform that opens up the possibilities of publishing new or unknown authors; GrandesLibros.com a community of readers that aims to become a space for exchange and reading recommendations; and DualLanguage.com a program that is specially designed for the Hispanic audience in the United States, which with a solid and innovative format encourages cultural integration through literature.

In 2017, she founded TICMAS, a modular platform that accompanies students, teachers and educational institutions in a digital transformation, providing content and learning tools. In 2018, VI-DATEC obtained international financing from The Rise Fund, a global fund committed to social and environmental work, in order to support the development of this digital platform.

Upward Women 
In 2016 Viviana launched the Argentine branch for Upward Women, a global network for executive women who come together to discuss the challenges women face and to identify creative solutions to overcome them. She has been appointed Latam Judge at MIT Inclusive Innovation Challenge and is regularly invited to discuss, in different forums the future of education.

Achievements and awards 
In 2016 Viviana Zocco won the Gold Stevie Award for Women in Business for Female Entrepreneur or Executive of the Year in Mexico, Central & South America. As long as, the Bronze Stevie Award for Women in Business for both categories: Female Entrepreneur of the Year - Business Products -11 to 2,500 Employees - All Other Industries; and Female Entrepreneur of the Year - Consumer Products -11 to 2,500 Employees

Personal life 
Zocco is married to Daniel Hadad, owner of Infobae, which whom she has four children.

References 

Argentine chief executives
Argentine women in business
1962 births
Living people
People from Buenos Aires
University of Virginia Darden School of Business alumni